John Janata (born April 10, 1961) is a former American football tackle. He played for the Chicago Bears in 1983.

References

1961 births
Living people
Players of American football from Chicago
American football tackles
Illinois Fighting Illini football players
Chicago Bears players